The United States Senate consists of 100 members, two from each of the 50 states. This list includes all current senators serving in the 118th United States Congress.

Party affiliation

Currently, all three Independent senators caucus with the Democratic party.

Leadership

Presiding officers

Majority leadership

Minority leadership

List of senators

See also
 Seniority in the United States Senate
 List of current members of the United States House of Representatives
 List of members of the United States Congress by longevity of service
 List of United States Senate committees
 List of United States congressional joint committees
 Religious affiliation in the United States Senate
 Shadow congressperson

Notes

References 

Senate
United States Congress
Current United States senators
United States